Alfred Green may refer to:
 Alfred A. Green (1828–1899), Canadian–born political and civic figure in California
 Alfred E. Green (1889–1960), American film director
 Alfred Rozelaar Green (1917–2013), British artist